Tropical Islands Resort is a tropical water park located in the former Brand-Briesen Airfield in Halbe, a municipality in the district of Dahme-Spreewald in Brandenburg, Germany,  from the southern boundary of Berlin. It is housed in a former airship hangar (known as the Aerium), the biggest free-standing hall in the world. The hall belonged to the company Cargolifter until its insolvency in 2002.

Tropical Islands has a maximum capacity of 8,200 visitors a day. In its first year of operation it attracted 975,000 visitors, according to the operators. The Tanjong company reported 155,000 visitors in the business year February 2004 to February 2005. Approximately 600 people work at Tropical Islands.

Tropical Islands has a world record for the largest indoor waterpark. It is bigger than Canada's World Waterpark at West Edmonton Mall. It is also the fourth-largest building in the world by usable volume.

Parques Reunidos acquired Tropical Islands in December 2018.

Access
It can be reached by taking the A13 autobahn. It can also be reached taking a train to Brand Tropical Islands station, followed by a free shuttle bus.

Background
In 1938, Nazi Germany began development of Brand-Briesen Airfield for the Luftwaffe. The Red Army overran the site in May 1945, and occupied the site after World War II, adding a second runway and nuclear-resistant command and control facilities for the fighter aircraft regiment.

With the reunification of Germany in 1989/1990, the Soviet Army agreed to return all military bases by 1994. Returned to the Federal Government of Germany in 1992, Cargolifter AG bought the former military airfield to construct airships. At 5.5 million m³ (194 million ft³), it is one of the largest buildings on Earth by volume, and is the world's largest single hall without supporting pillars inside. The hangar was commissioned as an airship hangar named Aerium in November 2000, but the airship it was intended to house – the CL160 – was never built. CargoLifter went bankrupt in mid-2002.

Concept

Tropical Islands was built by the Malaysian corporation Tanjong in the former airship hangar known as the Aerium.
The hangar – the third largest free-standing hall in the world – was originally designed to protect large airships from the elements. It was purchased by Tanjong on 11 June 2003 for €17.5 million, of which €10 million was a subsidy from the state of Brandenburg. The building permit for constructing the theme park inside the hall was granted on 2 February 2004 and Tropical Islands officially opened on 19 December 2004.

Tropical Islands is home to the biggest indoor rainforest in the world, a beach, many tropical plants and a number of swimming pools, bars and restaurants. It is open around the clock, every day of the year – except on Christmas Eve.

On entering the hall, visitors choose between different basic admission options with different prices. Tropical Islands is divided into two main areas, each with its own admission price. Visitors can move from one area to the other by paying an additional daily charge. Additional charges also apply for areas such as the water slide tower (not always), crazy golf course, African Jungle Lift, evening show and internal accommodation area. The entertainment programme comprises a gala evening show, smaller shows during the day and various events.

Themed areas

Tropical Islands has a number of different themed areas:
The Tropical Village, featuring copies of traditional buildings from Thailand, Borneo, Samoa and Bali.
The Rainforest, with around 50,000 plants and 600 different species, including some rare plants.

Further development

A  children's play area opened in 2007. In mid-2007, a sauna and spa facility with six separate areas was added, the largest tropical sauna complex in Europe. The design of the saunas is inspired by UNESCO World Heritage Sites in South-East Asia, including a cave temple on Elephanta Island in India and the Angkor Wat temple in Cambodia.

According to figures published by the company, Tropical Islands has spent EUR 23 million on further development and expansion work. The original total investment sum announced was EUR 75 million, including a EUR 17 million subsidy from the state of Brandenburg. The purpose of the subsidy for the development work was to preserve the 501 jobs.

In 2008, a campsite was added close to the Tropical Islands hall.

Problems
At first, visitor numbers remained behind original estimates. For a cost-effective operation, 1.25 million visitors per year are required. In 2005, the resort lost between 10 and 20 million euros. By October 2006 there were about 600,000 visitors. The initial lack of visitors has been attributed to various reasons, including the relatively remote location of Tropical Islands. In addition, in Berlin, South Brandenburg, the direct surrounding area of the resort, the disposable income is below the national average. The target demographic of the resort was extended to attract visitors from further away, including Poland.

By altering the ticket price structure and adding new overnight accommodation, visitors attendance has been improved. According to the then managing director Ole Bested Hensing, 2008 was the first time Tropical Islands Resort made a profit. It recorded 300,000 overnight stays.

At the start there were problems with the plants that were under the light-tight dome. In October 2005, the southern front along the "South Sea" bathing area had a special UV-transparent film made of ETFE installed. This  "window" allows daylight. The palms, trees and bushes have grown well since.

See also
 Hangar One

References 

"Waterpark Information" (in German).

External links 

 Tropical Islands Resort English Homepage
 
 Article on Tropical Islands

Water parks in Germany
Tourist attractions in Brandenburg
Buildings and structures in Dahme-Spreewald
Indoor amusement parks
2004 establishments in Germany